Bluesin' Around is an album by guitarist Kenny Burrell recorded in 1961 and 1962 and first released on the Columbia label in 1983.

Reception

Allmusic awarded the album 3 stars stating " the results, even with a few dated numbers such as "Mambo Twist," are excellent".

Track listing 
All compositions by Kenny Burrell except as indicated
 "Mambo Twist" - 5:06   
 "The Switch" - 3:04   
 "The Squeeze" - 4:17   
 "Bluesin' Around" - 3:42   
 "Bye and Bye" (Traditional) - 2:50   
 "Moten Swing" (Bennie Moten) - 6:20   
 "People Will Say We're in Love" (Oscar Hammerstein II, Richard Rodgers) - 3:41   
 "One Mint Julep" (Rudy Toombs) - 3:25   
 "Mood Indigo" (Barney Bigard, Duke Ellington, Irving Mills) - 4:40  
Recorded in New York City on November 21, 1961 (tracks 1 & 2), November 29, 1961 (tracks 3, 5 & 9), March 6, 1962 (track 4) and April 30, 1962 (tracks 6-8)

Personnel 
Kenny Burrell - guitar
Eddie Bert - trombone (track 4)
Illinois Jacquet - tenor saxophone (tracks 1-3, 5 & 9)
Leo Wright - alto saxophone (tracks 6-8)
Hank Jones - piano (tracks 1-5 & 9)
Jack McDuff - organ (tracks 6-8)
George Duvivier (track 4), Major Holley (tracks 1-3, 5 & 9) - bass
Osie Johnson (tracks 1 & 2), Louis Hayes (track 4), Jimmy Crawford (tracks 3, 5 & 9), Joe Dukes (tracks 6-8) - drums

References 

Kenny Burrell albums
1983 albums
Columbia Records albums
Albums produced by John Hammond (producer)